Götaälvbron (Göta älv Bridge) was a bascule bridge  in central Gothenburg, Sweden, carrying normal road vehicles and trams. The bridge was constructed in 1937 to 1939 and in 1966 it was widened. It was closed for decommissioning in June 2021.

Geography 
The bridge connected the island of Hisingen with the main land of Gothenburg between Nils Ericssongatan and Hjalmar Brantningsgatan on Hisingen. The bridge crossed the river just east of Lilla Bommen on the mainland side and just east of Freeport on the Hisingen side.

History 
As far back as the 1870s, there were discussions about a high bridge in Majorna, from Bangatan to Skat Mountain in Lindholmen. In 1904, it was proposed to build a tunnel between the Lilla Bommen and Tingstadsvassen. After the decision that the old bridge of Hisingen would be replaced, the choice was between a new bridge or a tunnel. A principle decision was taken in 1933 on what would become a "Götaälvbro" and the question was consequently put on hold for some time. Preparatory ground works began in November 1935.

The bridge is used by motor vehicles, trams, bicycles and pedestrians. The bridge cost 8.2 million Swedish kronor (SEK) to construct, of which the state contributed 25%. With access points included the final cost were 13 million SEK.

The bridge was built mainly by Germans and was inaugurated on 26November 1939 by Communications Minister Gerhard Strindlund, in the presence of representatives of port authorities from Oslo, Copenhagen and Helsinki. At the time, the bridge was only four-lane, but was later expanded by one lane and walking and cycle tracks on each side.

Until 1968, the heavy transit traffic of the E6 highway used the bridge, but even in 2016, the bridge is the most important connection primarily for local traffic and public transport between central Gothenburg and Hisingen even with the presence of Älvsborgsbron, Tingstadstunneln and Angeredsbron.

With the construction of Hisingsbron which began in 2017 and opened traffic for pedestrians, bicycles, cars and buses on 9 May 2021. Götaälvbron stopped traffic on 12 June 2021.

Future 
The bridge is considered to be in a very bad condition, leading to high maintenance costs. It has now been replaced by Hisingsbron, approximately one block east. The existing bridge could not be demolished until the new one had been built, because Hisingen would then has lost its only tram link with the mainland.

The demolition of the bridge began during the summer of 2021 in conjunction with the opening of Hisingsbron, and is expected to continue until spring 2022.

References 

Bridges in Sweden
Hisingen
Bridges completed in 1939
1939 establishments in Sweden
Transport in Gothenburg
Bascule bridges